Bisaya nossidiiformis is a beetle that is native to Iran, and the sole member of the genus Bisaya. Its diet consists of mainly dead wood and leaf litter .

References

Scirtoidea
Beetles of Asia